Sultan Saeed (born August 1, 1976) is a Maldivan athlete specializing in the 100 metres.

Participating in the 2004 Summer Olympics, he finished eighth in his 100 metres heat, thus failing to make it through to the second round.

References
 Sports Reference

External links
 

1976 births
Living people
Maldivian male sprinters
Olympic athletes of the Maldives
Athletes (track and field) at the 2004 Summer Olympics
Place of birth missing (living people)